Visitors to Kenya need a visa unless they come from one of the visa-exempt countries. All visas to Kenya are issued online.

Visa policy map

Visa exemptions
Nationals of the following countries may visit Kenya without a visa for stays of up to 90 days (unless otherwise noted):

The following groups are also exempt from visas:
Children under age 16, regardless of nationality;
Passengers in transit, if they do not leave the ship or the international transit area of the airport;
Holders of diplomatic, official and service passports of Brazil, Cuba and Turkey, of diplomatic and service passports of China and Iran, and of diplomatic passports of India, Israel and Nigeria;
Holders of laissez-passers issued by Africa Re, African Airlines Travel Association, African Housing Fund, African Development Bank, African Union of Broadcasting, African Union, Arab Bank for Economic Development in Africa, Common Market for Eastern and Southern Africa, Desert Locust Control Organization for Central and Southern Africa, Environment Liaison Centre International, European Union, Intergovernmental Authority on Development, International Labour Organization, International Monetary Fund, International Potato Center, International Red Locust Control Organization for Central and Southern Africa, United Nations and the World Bank;
Serving members of the British Armed Forces;
Crew members of aircraft for up to 7 days, and of ships for up to 14 days;
Owners of private aircraft stopping for refueling without leaving the airport.

A visa waiver agreement for ordinary passports was signed with Mozambique in November 2018 and it is yet to come into force.

A visa waiver protocol for diplomatic passports was signed with the United Arab Emirates, but it is yet to come into force.

History
The San Marino-United Kingdom visa waiver agreement of 1949 was extended for Kenya and San Marino in 1963 and still applies. The agreement is of symbolic value for Kenyan citizens but does have an effect on San Marino passport holders.

eVisa
From 1 January 2021, all visas to Kenya are issued online and are no longer available on arrival.

Visa applications from nationals of the following countries and from stateless people are referred to the Directorate of Immigration Services and may take longer for processing:

East African Tourist Visa
From February 2014, Kenya, Rwanda and Uganda issue an East African Tourist Visa. The visa costs 100 USD and has no restrictions on nationality. It is a non-extendable multiple-entry 90-day visa that has to be first used to enter the country that issued it.

See also

Visa requirements for Kenyan citizens

References

External links
eVisa for Kenya, official website
Kenyan visa eligibility, official website

Kenya
Foreign relations of Kenya